Jorge Guillermo Borges (24 February 1874 – 14 February 1938) was an Argentine lawyer, teacher, writer, philosopher and translator. He was also an anarchist and a follower of Herbert Spencer's philosophy of philosophical anarchism. He was Jorge Luis Borges's father.

Background
In 1898, he married Leonor Acevedo Suárez with whom he had two children: writer Jorge Luis Borges and painter Norah Borges. Due to the failing eyesight that would eventually afflict his son, Borges eventually abandoned his law career and the family moved to Geneva, Switzerland before World War I, where the young Jorge Luis was treated by an eye specialist. In 1921, the Borges family returned to Argentina.

Jorge Guillermo Borges studied law in Buenos Aires along with his lifelong friend Macedonio Fernández. He did not practice law and turned to literature instead, allegedly writing one novel: El Caudillo, published in Palma de Mallorca in 1921. Inserted in a typical criollista literary tendency of the time the novel generates ambiguous sensations that lead its reader to believe that — in what would later become pure magic realism — such a text could be the novel that Jorge Guillermo never wrote.

Borges had maternal ancestral roots in Staffordshire, England. A cultivated man, he read fluently in English, was an agnostic, a skeptic, and had a deep interest in metaphysics. At the homes where he settled with his wife and family both in Palermo and Geneva, he kept a large library offering his children a complex and profound universe. On those bookshelves, young Jorge Luis and Norah could find important works in English literature: Robert Louis Stevenson, Nathaniel Hawthorne, H. G. Wells, Samuel Taylor Coleridge, Rudyard Kipling, Thomas De Quincey, Edgar Allan Poe, and Herman Melville. His son would later remark that "if I were asked to name the chief event in my life, I should say my father's library."

References

1874 births
1938 deaths
Argentine philosophers
Argentine male writers
Argentine translators
Individualist anarchists
English–Spanish translators
Burials at La Recoleta Cemetery
Argentine people of Spanish descent
Argentine people of Portuguese descent
Argentine people of English descent
Argentine people of Uruguayan descent
Jorge Luis Borges
20th-century Argentine writers
20th-century male writers